Seven Romances on Poems by Alexander Blok (Op. 127) is a vocal-instrumental song cycle by Dmitri Shostakovich, based on verses by Alexander Blok.

It was written in 1967 for Galina Vishnevskaya. The composition is written for soprano, violoncello, violin, and piano. The first performance took place on October 25, 1967 at the Moscow Conservatoire Hall with Mstislav Rostropovich on cello, Mieczysław Weinberg on piano, David Oistrakh on violin and with Vishnevskaya.

Structure 
  
The cycle consists of seven parts:

1) Song of Ophelia
2) Gamayun, the Bird of Prophecy
3) We Were Together
4) Gloom Enwraps the Sleeping City
5) The Storm
6) Secret Signs
7) Music

Recordings 

ArteMiss Trio. (Alžběta Poláčková-soprano) ArcoDiva CD. UP 0069-2131

Galina Vishnevskaya (soprano), Mstislav Rostropovich (cello), Ulf Hoelscher (violin) and Vasso Devetzi (piano) for EMI

References

External links 
 Info on Boosey and Hawkes page

Compositions by Dmitri Shostakovich
1967 compositions